Luup was a newspaper published in Estonia, Vihula rural municipality, 2001–2007.

References

Newspapers published in Estonia